Star Wars is an American epic space opera media franchise created by George Lucas, which began with the eponymous 1977 film and quickly became a worldwide pop-culture phenomenon. The franchise has been expanded into various films and other media, including television series, video games, novels, comic books, theme park attractions, and themed areas, comprising an all-encompassing fictional universe. The franchise holds a Guinness World Records title for the "Most successful film merchandising franchise." In 2020, the Star Wars franchise's total value was estimated at billion, and it is currently the fifth-highest-grossing media franchise of all time.

The eleven live-action films together have been nominated for 37 Academy Awards, of which they have won seven. The films were also awarded a total of three Special Achievement Awards. The Empire Strikes Back and Return of the Jedi received Special Achievement Awards for their visual effects, and Star Wars received a Special Achievement Award for its alien, creature and robot voices.

The original film was nominated for most of the major categories, including Best Picture, Best Director, Best Original Screenplay, and Best Supporting Actor for Alec Guinness, while all sequels have been nominated for technical categories.

Star Wars has the most Saturn Awards (for a film franchise) with 44 wins.

Star Wars (1977) was originally nominated for 16 awards and won 12; the actual number of wins include a special award to reward Gilbert Taylor's cinematography, a special award to celebrate its 20th anniversary in 1997, and 1 win as a part of a compilation (Best DVD Movie Collection) for Star Wars Trilogy (2004) in 2005.

Total Saturn Award wins for each Star Wars film includes:

14 wins for Star Wars (1977), 4 wins for The Empire Strikes Back (1980), 5 wins for Return of the Jedi (1983), 2 wins for The Phantom Menace (1999), 2 wins for Attack of the Clones (2002), 2 wins for Revenge of the Sith (2005), 8 wins for The Force Awakens (2015), 3 wins for Rogue One (2016), 3 wins for The Last Jedi (2017), and 1 win for a compilation (Best DVD Movie Collection) comprising three films (Star Wars Trilogy) of the franchise.

Music for Star Wars has earned composer John Williams most of the awards and nominations in his career:

1 Academy Awards (5 nominations), 1 Golden Globe Awards (1 nomination), 2 BAFTA Awards (2 nominations), 6 Grammy Award (11 nominations), 3 Saturn Awards (4 nominations).

To the same John Williams' music to A New Hope is the only Golden Globe win for the Star Wars.

Academy Awards

Golden Globe Awards

BAFTA Awards

Grammy Award

Saturn Awards

Hugo Award

Note

References

External links 

 
 
 
 
 
 
 
 
 
 
 
 

Accolades
Lists of accolades by film series
Lists of accolades by franchises